Union Theological Seminary may refer to:

 Guangdong Union Theological Seminary, a Protestant seminary in Guangzhou, Guangdong, China
 Nanjing Union Theological Seminary, a Protestant seminary in Jiangsu, China
 Tokyo Union Theological Seminary, a Protestant seminary in Japan
 Union Presbyterian Seminary or Union Theological Seminary in Virginia and Presbyterian School of Christian Education, in Richmond, Virginia and Charlotte, North Carolina
 Union Theological Seminary (New York City), a Christian seminary affiliated with Columbia University
 Union Theological Seminary (Philippines), a Protestant seminary in Dasmariñas, Cavite, Philippines

See also
 Albright College, formerly known as Union Seminary, a college in Reading, Pennsylvania
 Union Biblical Seminary in Pune, India
 United Theological Seminary in Dayton, Ohio, affiliated with the United Methodist Church
 United Theological Seminary of the Twin Cities in New Brighton, Minnesota, affiliated with the United Church of Christ
 Unification Theological Seminary in Barrytown, New York, affiliated with the Unification Church
 Union College (disambiguation)
 Union Theological College, Belfast
 Union University (disambiguation)